The Youngstown City Series was an OHSAA athletic conference that began play in 1925 and lasted until the end of the 2006–07 school year.  Its members were located in the city of Youngstown, Ohio (including all Youngstown City School District high schools), although membership was eventually extended to Timken High School in Canton, Ohio.  Some of the schools closed during the league's tenure, while the rest left prior to the closings or at the league's demise.

Members

Note: During this time, East High School was known as the "Golden Bears" and wore the colors of blue and gold.  The school closed as a high school in 1998 and when it reopened in 2007, the students chose to be the "Panthers", as well as having school colors of light blue and silver.  In 2017, East HS returned to using the Golden Bears nickname and the former school colors of blue and gold.

The legacy of all six Youngstown public high schools was to be honored with pennants for each school (Chaney, East, North, Rayen, South, & Wilson) to fly at the newly-renovated Rayen Stadium, which had its field named for Rayen alum Jack Antonucci in 2012.  The stadium had originally been built in 1924 and was serving as the playing surface for JV, Freshmen, and Middle School football games since the last regular season varsity home game for a Youngstown City School in 1993.

League champions

References

Further reading
Mark Knows It All/The Friday Morning Rant.  April 1, 2011.  http://tippynews.blogspot.com/.  Accessed February 7, 2015.
League Winners, City Series. August 23, 2009. Vindy.com.  Accessed March 10, 2015.

Ohio high school sports conferences
1925 establishments in Ohio
2003 disestablishments in Ohio